Cyanopepla alonzo is a moth of the subfamily Arctiinae. It was described by Arthur Gardiner Butler in 1876. It is found in Colombia, Venezuela and Peru.

References

Cyanopepla
Moths described in 1876